Proofs of the mathematical result that the rational number  is greater than  (pi) date back to antiquity. One of these proofs, more recently developed but requiring only elementary techniques from calculus, has attracted attention in modern mathematics due to its mathematical elegance and its connections to the theory of Diophantine approximations. Stephen Lucas calls this proof "one of the more beautiful results related to approximating ".

The purpose of the proof is not primarily to convince its readers that   is indeed bigger than ; systematic methods of computing the value of  exist. If one knows that  is approximately 3.14159, then it trivially follows that  < , which is approximately 3.142857. But it takes much less work to show that  <  by the method used in this proof than to show that  is approximately 3.14159.

Background

The approximation has been known since antiquity. Archimedes wrote the first known proof that  is an overestimate in the 3rd century BCE, although he may not have been the first to use that approximation. His proof proceeds by showing that  is greater than the ratio of the perimeter of a regular polygon with 96 sides to the diameter of a circle it circumscribes.

The proof 
The proof can be expressed very succinctly:

Therefore,  > .

The evaluation of this integral was the first problem in the 1968 Putnam Competition.
It is easier than most Putnam Competition problems, but the competition often features seemingly obscure problems that turn out to refer to something very familiar. This integral has also been used in the entrance examinations for the Indian Institutes of Technology.

Details of evaluation of the integral
That the integral is positive follows from the fact that the integrand is non-negative; the denominator is positive and the numerator is a product of nonnegative numbers. Since the integrand is continuous at that point and nonnegative elsewhere, the integral from 0 to 1 must be strictly positive.

It remains to show that the integral in fact evaluates to the desired quantity:

 

(See polynomial long division.)

Quick upper and lower bounds

Thus we have

hence 3.1412 <  < 3.1421 in decimal expansion. The bounds deviate by less than 0.015% from . See also .

Proof that 355/113 exceeds 

In decimal expansion, this means , where the bold digits of the lower and upper bound are those of .

Extensions
For explicit calculations, consider, for every integer ,

where the middle integral evaluates to

involving . The correction term and error bound is given by

where the approximation (the tilde means that the quotient of both sides tends to one for large ) of the central binomial coefficient follows from Stirling's formula and shows the fast convergence of the integrals to .

Calculation of these integrals: For all integers  and  we have

Applying this formula recursively  times yields

Furthermore,

where the first equality holds, because the terms for  cancel, and the second equality arises from the index shift  in the first sum.

Application of these two results gives

For integers , using integration by parts  times, we obtain

Setting , we obtain

For  we get

and

hence , where the bold digits of the lower and upper bound are those of .

with correction term and error bound

hence .

with

which gives .

See also
Approximations of 
Chronology of computation of 
Lindemann–Weierstrass theorem (proof that  is transcendental)
List of topics related to 
Proof that  is irrational

Footnotes

Notes

Citations

External links
 The problems of the 1968 Putnam competition, with this proof listed as question A1.

Pi
Article proofs